The 2016 Badminton Asia Championships was the 35th edition of the Badminton Asia Championships. It was held in Wuhan, China, from April 26 to May 1.

Venue
 This tournament was held at Wuhan Sports Center Gymnasium.

Medalists

Medal table

Men's singles

Seeds

  Chen Long (final)
  Lin Dan (semifinals)
  Lee Chong Wei (champion)
  Kento Momota (withdrew)
  Tian Houwei (semifinals)
  Chou Tien-chen (quarterfinals)
  Tommy Sugiarto (quarterfinals)
  Srikanth Kidambi (first round)

Top Half

Bottom Half

Finals

Women's singles

Seeds

  Li Xuerui (final)
  Nozomi Okuhara (quarterfinals)
  Wang Shixian (quarterfinals)
  Ratchanok Intanon (second round)
  Saina Nehwal (semifinals)
  Wang Yihan (champion)
  Sung Ji-hyun (semifinals)
  Tai Tzu-ying (quarterfinals)

Top Half

Bottom Half

Finals

Men's doubles

Seeds

  Lee Yong-dae / Yoo Yeon-seong (champion)
  Mohammad Ahsan / Hendra Setiawan (second round)
  Chai Biao / Hong Wei (first round)
  Fu Haifeng / Zhang Nan (semifinals)
  Hiroyuki Endo / Kenichi Hayakawa (second round)
  Ko Sung-hyun / Shin Baek-cheol (quarterfinals)
  Kim Gi-jung / Kim Sa-rang (second round)
  Angga Pratama / Ricky Karanda Suwardi (second round)

Top Half

Bottom Half

Finals

Women's doubles

Seeds

  Misaki Matsutomo / Ayaka Takahashi (champion)
  Luo Ying / Luo Yu (quarterfinals)
  Nitya Krishinda Maheswari / Greysia Polii (semifinals)
  Tian Qing / Zhao Yunlei (quarterfinals)

Top Half

Bottom Half

Finals

Mixed doubles

Seeds

  Zhang Nan / Zhao Yunlei (champion)
  Tontowi Ahmad / Liliyana Natsir (final)
  Liu Cheng / Bao Yixin (second round)
  Ko Sung-hyun / Kim Ha-na (semifinals)

Top Half

Bottom Half

Finals

References

External links
Badminton Asia Championships 2016

Badminton Asia Championships
Asian Badminton Championships
Badminton tournaments in China
International sports competitions hosted by China
2016 in Chinese sport
Sport in Wuhan